The following is a list of mayors of the city of Recife, Brazil.

 , 1891	
 Francisco do Rego Barros Lacerda, 1891-1892
 Manuel Pinto Damaso, 1892-1893	
 , 1893-1896	
 , 1896-1899	
 Luiz Cavalcanti de Almeida, 1899	
 Esmeraldino Olímpio de Torres Bandeira, 1899	
 Manuel dos Santos Moreira, 1899-1905	
 Martins de Barros, 1905-1908	
 , 1908-1911	
 Eudoro Correia, 1911-1915	
 Marco Antônio de Morais Rego, 1915-1918	
 Lima Castro, 1918-1922	
 Antônio Ribeiro Pessoa, 1922	
 , 1922-1925, 1931-1934
 Alfredo Osório de Cerqueira, 1925-1926	
 , 1926-1928	
 Francisco da Costa Maia, 1928-1930	
 Lauro Borba, 1930-1931 
 João Pereira Borges, 1934-1937
 , 1937-1945
 José dos Anjos, 1945-1946
 , 1946, 1955-1960, 1963-1964
 Clóvis de Castro, 1946-1947
 Antônio Alves Pereira, 1947-1948
 Manuel César de Morais Rego, 1948-1951
 Antônio A. Pereira, 1951-1952
 Jorge Manuel Martins da Silva, 1952-1953
 , 1953-1955	
 , 1955		
 Miguel Arraes, 1960-1963	
 Liberato da Costa Júnior, 1963		
 , 1964-1969, 1971-1975	
 Geraldo Magalhães Melo, 1969-1971 
 , 1975-1979
 , 1979-1982
 Jorge Cavalcante, 1982-1983
 , 1983-1985, 1989-1990
 Jarbas Vasconcelos, 1986-1988, 1993-1996
 , 1990-1992	
 , 1997-2000
 , 2001-2008
 , 2009-2012
 Geraldo Júlio, 2013-2020
 João Henrique Campos, 2021-present

See also
  (city council)
 Timeline of Recife
 List of mayors of largest cities in Brazil (in Portuguese)
 List of mayors of capitals of Brazil (in Portuguese)

References

This article incorporates information from the Portuguese Wikipedia.

recife